The Lost River is a  river in the Appalachian Mountains of Hardy County in West Virginia's Eastern Panhandle region. The Lost River is geologically the same river as the Cacapon River: It flows into an underground channel northeast of McCauley along West Virginia Route 259 at "the Sinks" and reappears near Wardensville as the Cacapon. The source of the Lost River lies south of Mathias near the West Virginia/Virginia border. Along with the Cacapon and North rivers, the Lost River serves as one of the three main segments of the Cacapon River and its watershed.

The river is listed as impaired due to pathogens by the state of West Virginia; this is likely due to the livestock and poultry raising activities throughout the valley.

The river was named for the fact it is a losing stream.

Tributaries
Tributary streams are listed from south (source) to north ("the Sinks").
Culler Run
Snyder Run
Upper Cove Run
Howards Lick Run
Whitehead Run
Lower Cove Run
Adams Run
Mill Gap Run
Kimsey Run
Camp Branch
Gap Run
Fravel Run
Baker Run
Long Lick Run
Camp Branch
Three Springs Run

Cities and towns along the Lost River
Baker
Lost City
Lost River
Mathias
McCauley

See also
List of West Virginia rivers
Lost River State Park

References

Rivers of Hardy County, West Virginia
Rivers of West Virginia
Tributaries of the Potomac River